Charles Girard may refer to:
Charles Frédéric Girard (1822–1895), French biologist
Charles J. Girard (1917–1970), brigadier general in the United States Army
Charlie Girard (1884–1936), Major League Baseball player